Jeff Burlingame (born June 14, 1971) is an American author of several books, including biographies of musicians John Lennon and Kurt Cobain, and critical looks at the historic and tragic plights of the Lost Boys of Sudan and the crew and passengers of the Titanic. His books have been honored by the New York Public Library and the NAACP, which in 2012 awarded him its highest literary honor at a nationally televised event in Hollywood, California. The previous year, his biography of Malcolm X was nominated for an Image Award.

Writing career
Jeff Burlingame began his professional writing career as a general assignment reporter for The Willapa Harbor Herald newspaper in Raymond, Washington. In 1997, he began working at The Daily World becoming the Aberdeen, Washington, paper's arts and entertainment editor shortly thereafter. In that capacity, he won numerous awards from the Society of Professional Journalists. In 2006, he became a copy editor for The News Tribune in Tacoma.

Later that year, Burlingame’s first book, Kurt Cobain: Oh Well, Whatever, Nevermind, was published. The book won recognition from the New York Public Library as a Book for the Teen Age in 2007, and received rave reviews from publications across the United States. Following the success of his first book, Burlingame began working as a full-time author. In the years since, he has written more than 30 books, including an unauthorized biography of Malcolm X, which was nominated for a coveted NAACP Image Award, alongside the works of Walter Dean Myers, Sharon Draper, Rita Williams-Garcia, and former Secretary of State Condoleezza Rice.

In 2012, Burlingame was once again nominated for an Image Award, this time for his in-depth biography of Olympic track and field legend Jesse Owens, and traveled to Los Angeles, California for the award ceremonies, held at the historic Shrine Auditorium, in February 2012. Burlingame won the award for Best Literary Work: Youth/Teens, besting fellow authors Walter Dean Myers, Kekla Magoon, Jerdine Nolen, and Nikki Grimes.

Kurt Cobain Memorial Foundation
In 2004, Burlingame, along with Aberdeen City Councilman Paul Fritts, founded the non-profit Kurt Cobain Memorial Foundation (formerly the Kurt Cobain Memorial Committee) to honor the late rock legend in his hometown. In 2005, the group installed a large sign reading "Welcome to Aberdeen: Come As You Are" at the east entrance to town. The non profit's future goals include a youth center and low-key memorial park. In September 2007, the foundation held its first rock concert, Lounge Acts, which drew hundreds of Nirvana fans across the globe. The event has been held each year since, growing larger each time.

Bibliography
Burlingame, Jeff (2006). Kurt Cobain: Oh Well, Whatever, Nevermind. Hardback ; Paperback 
Burlingame, Jeff (2008). Hillary Clinton: A Life in Politics. 
Burlingame, Jeff (2008). Edgar Allan Poe: Deep Into That Darkness Peering. 
Burlingame, Jeff (2009). Jesse James: I Will Never Surrender. 
Burlingame, Jeff (2010). Aerosmith: Walk This Way. 
Burlingame, Jeff (2010). Malcolm X: I Believe in the Brotherhood of Man, All Men. (Nominee, 2011 NAACP Image Awards)
Burlingame, Jeff (2010). John Lennon: Imagine. 
Burlingame, Jeff (2010). Avril Lavigne: Celebrity with Heart. 
Burlingame, Jeff (2011). Jesse Owens: I Always Loved Running. 
Burlingame, Jeff (2012). Government Entitlements. ISBNs: 9781608704910 (print); 9781608706433 (e-book)
Burlingame, Jeff (2012). Prisons: Rehabilitate or Severely Punish? 
Burlingame, Jeff (2011). Taylor Swift: Music Superstar. 
Burlingame, Jeff (2012). Titanic Tragedy. ISBNs: 9781608704507 (print); 9781608707225 (e-book)
Burlingame, Jeff (2012). Story of Bad Boy Entertainment. ISBNs: 9781422221112 (hardcover); 9781422221242 (paperback); 9781422294635 (ebook)
Burlingame, Jeff (2012). Moon Olympic Peninsula. ISBNs: 9781612381459 (paperback); B008724IEW (Kindle)
Burlingame, Jeff (2012). Lost Boys of Sudan. ISBNs: 9781608704750 (print); 9781608706966 (ebook)
Burlingame, Jeff (2013). Crystal Meth. ISBNs: 9781608708239 (print); 9781608708291 (ebook)
Burlingame, Jeff (2013). Demi! Latina Star Demi Lovato. 
Burlingame, Jeff (2013). Alcohol. ISBNs: 9781608708222 (print); 9781608708284 (ebook)
Burlingame, Jeff (2013). Across the Aisles: Sid Snyder's Remarkable Life in Groceries & Government.  (paperback); ASIN: B00BJALX6A (Kindle)

References

External links
Interview with Jeff Burlingame
Kurt Cobain’s story told to teens by former World editor
Author with local roots releases book on Hillary Clinton
txt NAACP Image Awards official site
 txt NAACP Awards at Variety
 Local author nominated for major award
 txt Burlingame reflects on NAACP Image Awards
 Local author wins NAACP award for biography of Jesse Owens
 Burlingame wins NAACP Image Award
 Local author wins NAACP Image award
 Sid Snyder recalled as a giant in the Legislature 
 Snyder book launch draws Olympia movers and shakers
 Sid Snyder book launch video

1971 births
Living people
Writers from Aberdeen, Washington
American non-fiction writers
Writers from Tacoma, Washington or nearby Pierce County communities.
People from Tacoma, Washington
Writers from Washington (state)